Brahmi is a Unicode block containing characters written in India from the 3rd century BCE through the first millennium CE. It is the predecessor to all modern Indic scripts.

History
The following Unicode-related documents record the purpose and process of defining specific characters in the Brahmi block:

References 

Unicode blocks